RuPaul was an American daytime talk show hosted by drag queen and television host RuPaul. It premiered on June 10, 2019, with a three-week test run on selected Fox TV stations. It was produced by Telepictures and Warner Bros., with Jill van Lokeren as executive producer. A teaser was released on April 2, 2019. After being broadcast on seven Fox stations, the show was not commissioned for a full series, since similar projects outperformed it – resulting in its cancellation.

Background
RuPaul was developed by Telepictures with hopes for a syndicated fall 2019 launch. While most networks picked up shows produced by studios that are also owned by their parent company, RuPaul, being produced by a subsidiary of the independent Warner Bros., had a "tougher" time finding a network to express interest. According to Deadline, Fox has been "open to programs from outside studios" and "ramping up its limited-run pickups" after being downsized following its acquisition by Disney, and this factored into the network picking up the show.

Overview
The series was referred to as a "modern take on the talk show format", with RuPaul saying he that he wanted to "spread love" with the show.

The premiere episode featured late-night talk show host James Corden, and stars of the Property Brothers, identical twin brothers Drew Scott and Jonathan Scott. Following episodes featured Ciara, Iggy Azalea, Adam Lambert, Leah Remini, Cory Booker, Lisa Vanderpump, Ricki Lake, Blac Chyna, Darnell Jordan, James Fox, Edward Hibbert and Paula Abdul as guests. Regular co-hosts on the show were RuPaul's Drag Race judges Michelle Visage and Ross Mathews.

References

External links

2019 American television series debuts
2019 American television series endings
2010s American television talk shows
Works by RuPaul
Television series by World of Wonder (company)
Television series by Telepictures
Television series by Warner Bros. Television Studios